Geoffrey Allan Boxshall FRS (born 13 June 1950) is a British zoologist, and Merit researcher at the Natural History Museum, working primarily on copepods.

Early life

Son of Jack Boxshall a Canadian bank manager and Sybil Boxshall (née Baker), a civil servant in the procurement department of the Ministry of Defence. He was educated at Churcher's College, Petersfield from 1961 to 1968. He was Vice Captain of College 1967–1968 and Captain of the Hockey XI 1968. He played rugby (open-side flanker) for Hampshire County in both the 1966–1967 and 1967–1968 seasons.

Career

Field
Boxshall is a whole organism biologist with a particular interest in copepod crustaceans. These are ubiquitous in aquatic systems but all radiated from a hyperbenthic origin in shallow marine waters. Multiple lineages of copepods colonised the open pelagic, fresh and subterranean waters, and colonised almost all other metazoan phyla as hosts as they adopted parasitism as a mode of life. The overarching aim of his research is to identify and understand the drivers generating the patterns of copepod biodiversity on the largest scales. His current focus is primarily on parasites: the repeated evolution of parasitism in copepods provides opportunities to examine the usage of different host taxa and to explore speciation patterns around major host colonisation or host switching events.

Academic achievements
He earned a First Class BSc in Zoology in 1971, and PhD in 1974, from the University of Leeds.

Awards
In 1994 he became a Fellow of The Royal Society and in 1998, he was awarded the Crustacean Society's Award for Excellence in Research.

Appointments
In 1974 he joined the Natural History Museum's Department of Zoology, and joined Life Sciences in 2014.

Boxshall has been the Secretary of the Zoological Society of London since 2011 and was Vice-President of the Linnean Society Council from 2012–2013.

Works
Rony Huys, Geoffrey Allan Boxshall, Copepod evolution, Ray Society, 1991, 

Geoffrey Allan Boxshall, Sheila H. Halsey, An introduction to copepod diversity, Volume 2, Ray Society, 2004,

References

External links
Publications by Boxshall at World Register of Marine Species

British carcinologists
Alumni of the University of Leeds
Fellows of the Royal Society
Living people
People educated at Churcher's College
1950 births
British parasitologists